Percy Harris KC (16 February 1925 – 28 September 2022) was a British barrister and judge.

References

1925 births
2022 deaths
British barristers